Raja Lawak Astro is a Malaysian TV reality show that searches for comedic talent. It started broadcasting in early 2007. Every week contestants perform a joke according to the theme set on stage. They are judged to choose winners to proceed to the next round. The winner is crowned "King of Comedy," as reviewed by the audience and the judge in the final round.

On air 

Raja Lawak Astro aired on Astro Ria during its first season and on Astro Prima during its second through sixth seasons, which were hosted by Johan and Zizan. The sixth and seventh seasons aired on Astro Warna and Mustika HD before the program was transferred to Astro AEC in December 2014. The eighth season became known as Super Comedian, airing in Chinese and the Skool of Lawak was replaced by Raja Lawak starting in 2014.

Hosts, judges, and contestants

Host 

Sharifah Shahira, who hosted the show for the first season, was replaced by two former contestants, Johan and Zizan, until the end of the seventh season. In Season 7, Yus and Tauke, also former contestants, were selected as temporary hosts, replacing Johan and Zizan.

Judges 

The show judges assess each contestant's performance and select the winners. On 2 April 2010, Din Beramboi, a judge since 2010, died after suffering from hemorrhagic dengue fever.

Contestants

Maharaja Lawak 

All of the finalists returned for Comedian Superstar, Maharaja Lawak, which was hosted by Dato' Ac Mizal to pick the best among the annual winners. Contestants from seasons one through five reunited to determine who is the best comedian among the winners of the previous seasons. The 12 finalists who competed are: 
 Jambu (Yus and Tauke)
 JoZan (Johan and Zizan)
 Nabil (Ahmad Nabil Ahmad)
 XN3  (Pak Cu and Anu)
 Sepah  (Jep, Shuib and Mamat)
 Jihan (Jihan Muse) 
 Amir (Amirullah)
 Wai (Wan Kecik, Achoe Kecik and Idlan)
 Alex (Alex Raja Lawak)
 Man (Man Raja Lawak)
 R2 (Rahim and Wan Lopez)
 Balas (Shuk and Fendi)

The show crowned comedian Sepah as the winner and the best comedian (King of the Kings).

References 

Malaysian reality television series